Edgar Ramos may refer to:

 Edgar Ramos (baseball) (born 1975), former pitcher in Major League Baseball
 Edgar Ramos (footballer) (born 1979), Colombian footballer